Iraca may refer to:
 Iraca, priest and ruler of the Muisca
 The Iraca Valley, where the seat of the iraca; Sugamuxi is situated
 Iraca (Incan god), god of the Incas
 Iraca (crater), crater on Saturn's Moon Rhea, named after the Incan god
 Carludovica palmata, called palma de iraca in Spanish
 Alexandre Iracà, Canadian politician